Unch Majha Zoka is an Indian television series directed by Viren Pradhan and was aired on Zee Marathi. The series premiered on 5 March 2012 from Monday to Saturday at 8 pm by replacing Ekach Hya Janmi Janu.

Summary 
It is a dramatization of the story of how the child Yamuna was given at age 11 in an arranged marriage to Mahadev Govind Ranade and then proceeded to defy society's expectation to become the social activist Ramabai Ranade. It is set during the British Raj in 1870s India.

Cast

Main 
 Spruha Joshi as Ramabai Ranade, Mahadevrao's wife and Govindrao's daughter-in-law
 Tejashree Walawalkar as maiden Yamuna Annasaheb Kurlekar and Young Ramabai Ranade
 Vikram Gaikwad as Mahadev Govind Ranade aka Madhavrao, Ramabai's husband, Govindrao's eldest son
 Sharad Ponkshe as Govindrao (Bhausaheb) Ranade, Mahadevrao, Durga Akka, Nilkantha (Aaba) and Shripad's (Baba) father, Ramabai's father-in-law, Gopikabai and Mai's husband
 Shailesh Datar as Annasaheb Kurlekar, Umabai's husband, Gopal, Daji, Keshav and Ramabai's father, Saraswatibai and Mahadevrao's father-in-law
 Kavita Lad as Umabai Annasaheb Kurlekar, Annasaheb's wife, Gopal, Daji, Keshav and Ramabai's mother, Saraswatibai and Mahadevrao's mother-in-law
 Rugvedi Pradhan as Mai Ranade, Govindrao's second wife, Ramabai's step mother-in-law, Mahadevrao and Durga Akka's step mother, Nilkantha (Aaba) and Shripad's (Baba) biological mother

Recurring 
 Sharmishtha Raut as Tai Kaku, Mahadevrao's widowed paternal aunt
 Sanyogita Bhave as Subhadra Kaku
 Mitali Mayekar as Ahilyabai, Moru Mama's third wife
 Saurabh Gokhale as Gopal Annasaheb Kurlekar, Ramabai's eldest brother, Saraswatibai's husband
 Pournima Talwalkar as Gopikabai Govindrao Ranade; Mahadevrao and Durga Akka's biological mother; Govindrao's first wife
 Amol Bavdekar as Moru Mama; Mahadevrao's step maternal uncle (Mama), Mai's brother
 Atul Kasva as Pandu Kaka, Ranades' househelper
 Shilpa Tulaskar as Rukminibai Joshi, Ramabai's maternal aunt (Maushi), Umabai's elder sister
 Neena Kulkarni as Aaji, Mai's mother, Govindrao's second mother-in-law
 Akshata Kulkarni as Kashibai Kanetkar
 Chaitrali Gupte as Annapoornabai Ramkrushna Bhandarkar
 Nayana Apte Joshi as Sakhartai; Tai Kaku's mother
 Nilpari Khanvalkar as Durga Akka (Durgabai Fadnavis), Mahadevrao's real sister, Govindrao and Gopikabai's daughter (widowed at an early age)
 Sushil Bhosale as Nilkantha (Aaba) Govindrao Ranade, Govindrao and Mai's first son, Mahadevrao's step-brother
 Ashish Joshi as Shripad (Baba) Govindrao Ranade, Govindrao and Mai's second son, Mahadevrao's step-brother 
 Niranjan Kulkarni as Damodar Abhyankar, Bayo's second husband 
 Nandita Dhuri-Patkar as Girijabai Ketkar
 Amol Kolhe as Mahatma Jyotiba Phule
 Suzanne Bernert as Miss Hertford
 Shweta Shinde as Special appearance
 Anil Gawas as Sakha Kaka
 Suruchi Adarkar as Muktabai Sathe (a widow guised as a married woman)
 Akshaya Bhingarde as Saraswatibai Gopal Kurlekar, Gopal's wife, Ramabai's elder sister-in-law
 Madhavi Soman as Bhagirathibai, Annasaheb's widowed sister, Umabai's sister-in-law, Ramabai's paternal aunt(Aatya)
 Ujwala Jog as Yashodabai Dandekar, Mahadevrao's first mother-in-law
 Sharad Bhutadiya as Vitthal Ranade (Vithu Kaka), Govindrao's Cousin, Subhadra Kaku's husband, Mahadevrao's uncle
 Mrunal Jadhav as Sakhu Damodar, Mahadevrao and Ramabai's neighbour in Nashik.

Production 
The story is based in the late 19th century Maharashtra. The sets for the show, presenting the houses and interiors resembling that era are constructed at Film City, Goregaon. Erected on 30-50 thousand square feet area, the set is mainly designed per descriptions of Ranade Wada as written by Ramabai Ranade in her biography Majhya Aayushyatlya Aathvani. Santosh Futane has designed the sets based on these descriptions and then making them shooting-friendly. The makeup rooms also have the old look from outside but are equipped with modern facilities from inside. The Theatrical property of old utensils, lamps, machines have been collected from various cities including rural areas like Padgha, Wada and Mokhada.

Special episode

1 hour 
 9 September 2012

2 hours 
 14 July 2013 (Last episode)

Awards

References

External links 
 
 

Marathi-language television shows
Zee Marathi original programming
2012 Indian television series debuts
2013 Indian television series endings